DePiero and De Piero is a surname. Notable people with the surname include:

 Dean DePiero (born 1968), American politician
 Gloria De Piero (born 1972), British television and radio presenter, and former Labour Party politician
 Mary DePiero (born 1968), Canadian diver

See also
 De Pietro

Surnames
Surnames of Italian origin